The 2018 Dally M Awards was presented on Wednesday 26 September 2018. They are the official annual awards of the National Rugby League and are named after Dally Messenger.

Dally M Medal
Dally M Player of the Year:  Roger Tuivasa-Sheck

Dally M Awards
The Dally M Awards are, as usual, conducted at the close of the regular season and hence do not take games played in the finals series into account. The Dally M Medal is for the official player of the year while the Provan-Summons Medal is for the fans' of "people's choice" player of the year.

Team of the Year

Presenters
Hosts
 Yvonne Sampson, Lara Pitt, Hannah Hollis and Jessica Yates

Top Try and Point Scorer
 Michael IrvineRookie Award  Billy Slater &  Johnathan ThurstonKen Stephen Medal Yvonne SampsonCoach of the Year Kevin WaltersCaptain of the YearWomen's Player of the Year Tarsha GaleCountdown Jess Yates & Mal MeningaTeam of the Year'''
 Todd Greenberg

Judging Panel
 Greg Alexander (Fox League)
 Braith Anasta (Fox League)
 Richie Barnett (Sky Sport)
 Gary Belcher (Fox League)
 Monty Betham (Sky Sport)
 Darryl Brohman 
 Danny Buderus (Fox League)
 Brett Finch (Fox League)
 Joe Galuvao 
 Mark Gasnier (Fox League)
 Ryan Girdler (Triple M)
 Daryl Halligan (Sky Sports)
 Andrew Johns (Nine)
 Dallas Johnson 
 Brett Kimmorley (Fox League)
 Darren Lockyer (Nine)
 Steve Menzies 
 Steve Roach (Fox League)
 Andrew Ryan (ABC)
 Jimmy Smith
 Peter Sterling (Nine)
 Alan Tongue (ABC)
 Kevin Walters (Fox League)

See also
Dally M Awards
Dally M Medal
2018 NRL season

Notes

References

Dally M Awards
Dally M Awards
2018 awards